, formerly Ruy Gonçalves Ramos Sobrinho until he obtained Japanese citizenship, is a former football player and manager, originally from Brazil, who spent his career in Japan and played for the Japan national team. Ramos is currently active as a television personality and tarento, represented with Irving.

Club career
Ramos was one of the first foreign players in Japanese professional football, joining club Japan Soccer League club Yomiuri (later Verdy Kawasaki) in 1977 at the age of 20. The club won the champions in Japan Soccer League 5 times, JSL Cup 3 times and Emperor's Cup 3 times. In Asia, the club also won 1987 Asian Club Championship. In 1992, Japan Soccer League was folded and founded new league J1 League. The club were the league champions in 1993 and 1994. The club also won 1992, 1993 and 1994 J.League Cup. In summer 1996, he moved to Kyoto Purple Sanga. In summer 1997, he returned to Verdy Kawasaki and he retired end of 1998 season. He was 41 years old. He was selected Japanese Footballer of the Year awards 2 times and Best Eleven 8 times. He was the one of the most central players in the golden era in Yomiuri/Verdy history.

International career
Ramos was an important member of the Japanese national team during their unsuccessful 1994 World Cup qualification.

In September 1990, when Ramos was 33 years old, he was called up for the Japan national team for the 1990 Asian Games. On 26 September, he debuted against Bangladesh. After his debut, he became a regular player for Japan. He was a member of the Japan team that won the 1992 Asian Cup and he played 4 matches in the competition. Under manager Hans Ooft, Japan progressed to the final qualifying stage of the AFC for the 1994 World Cup. Ruy Ramos was on the pitch when Japan's hope to play in the finals was dashed by an injury-time Iraqi equaliser in the last qualifier, the match that the Japanese fans now refer to as the Agony of Doha. In 1995, Ramos also played at King Fahd Cup. He played 32 games and scored 1 goal for Japan until 1995.

Managerial career
Ramos briefly came out of his retirement for Okinawa Kariyushi FC as player–technical adviser in 2002. However, he left the club after a row with the management at the end of the season. Then he served as technical adviser for crosstown FC Ryukyu.

In March 2005, Ramos became coach of the Japan national beach soccer team and took them to the 2005 World Cup, where they finished fourth.

In January 2006, he was named coach of his former squad Tokyo Verdy, freshly relegated from J1 League. After a disappointing 2006 season in J2 League, Coach Ramos stated that if his team did not win the first game of the 2007 season, he would step down as head coach. The first game was on 4 March against Thespa Kusatsu, one of the weakest teams in the league, and Tokyo won this match 5-0. His team managed to finish 2nd after all and Tokyo Verdy returned to Division 1. After the season, Ramos became the executive director of the club.

In 2009, Ramos became a manager for Japan national beach soccer team again. He managed at 2009, 2011 and 2013 and 2019 FIFA World Cup.

In 2014, Ramos signed with J2 League club FC Gifu. However the results of the club were bad every season and he was sacked in July 2016.

In 2018, Ramos was selected Japan Football Hall of Fame.

Career statistics

Club

International

Managerial statistics

Honours

Club
Asian Club Championship: 1987
Japan Soccer League Division 1: 1983, 1984, 1986/87, 1990/91, 1991/92
JSL Cup: 1979, 1985, 1991
Konica Cup: 1990
XEROX Champions Cup: 1992
J1 League: 1993, 1994
Emperor's Cup: 1984, 1986, 1987
J.League Cup: 1992, 1993, 1994
Japanese Super Cup: 1994, 1995

International
AFC Asian Cup: 1992

Individual
Japan Soccer League Division 1 top scorer: 1979, 1983
Japanese Footballer of the Year: 1990, 1991
J.League Best XI: 1993, 1994

See also
 Ramos Rui no World Wide Soccer - video game licensed/endorsed by Ruy Ramos

References

External links

 
 
 Japan National Football Team Database
 
 
 Japan Football Hall of Fame at Japan Football Association
  

1957 births
Living people
Brazilian emigrants to Japan
Naturalized citizens of Japan
Japanese footballers
Brazilian footballers
Japan international footballers
Japan Soccer League players
J1 League players
Tokyo Verdy players
Kyoto Sanga FC players
1992 AFC Asian Cup players
1995 King Fahd Cup players
AFC Asian Cup-winning players
Japanese beach soccer players
Japanese football managers
J2 League managers
Tokyo Verdy managers
FC Gifu managers
Expatriate footballers in Japan
Footballers at the 1990 Asian Games
Association football midfielders
Asian Games competitors for Japan